Balloo may refer to:

 Balloo, County Down, a small village in County Down, Northern Ireland
 Balloo, County Antrim, a townland in County Antrim, Northern Ireland
 Balloo (Island Magee), a townland in County Antrim, Northern Ireland
 Balloo, Netherlands, a village in the northeast Netherlands

See also
 Baloo, a fictional bear in Rudyard Kipling's The Jungle Book